

Buildings and structures

Buildings
 1417–1420 – Ulugh Beg Madrasah in Samarkand is built.
 1419–1427 – Ospedale degli Innocenti in Florence (first stage), designed by Filippo Brunelleschi.
 1420
 Khan Jaqmaq, Damascus, is completed.
 Forbidden City of Beijing, China, is completed.
 Temple of Heaven in Beijing is completed.

 1421 – Traditional foundation date of Larabanga Mosque in northern Ghana.
 1424 – Start of final stage of construction of Doge's Palace, Venice.
 1425 – Rebuilding of Sherborne Abbey choir, England, begins.
 c. 1425 – Rebuilding of St. Leonhard, Frankfurt, choir, perhaps by Madern Gerthener.
 1428–1430 – Ca' d'Oro, Venice, built by Giovanni and his son Bartolomeo Bon for the Contarini family of doges.
 1427 – Harmondsworth Great Barn in England is completed.
 1428 – Church of Sant'Agostino, Amatrice, Kingdom of Naples, is built.
 1429 – Ulugh Beg Observatory in Samarkand is completed.

Births
 c. 1429 – Guiniforte Solari, Milanese engineer, architect and sculptor (died 1481)

Deaths

References

Architecture